Malecón is a word used in Spanish-speaking countries, and especially in nations of Latin America, for a stone-built embankment or esplanade along a waterfront.

It may refer to
Malecón, Havana, Cuba
Malecon cocktails, named after the Malecón in Havana.
Malecón 2000, Guayaquil, Ecuador
Malecón, Puerto Vallarta, Jalisco, Mexico
The Malecon Center, on the Malecón, Santo Domingo, Dominican Republic
El Malecón, a football stadium in Torrelavega, Spain

There are also well-known malecóns in Mazatlán, Campeche and Veracruz, Mexico; in Cartagena, Colombia; and many other cities.

Waterfronts